Holstebro Municipality is a municipality (Danish, kommune) in Region Midtjylland on the Jutland peninsula in west Denmark. January 2022). Its mayor is H. C. Østerby, a member of the Social Democratic party.

The main town and the site of its municipal council is the town of Holstebro.

On 1 January 2007 Holstebro municipality was, due to Kommunalreformen ("The Municipal Reform" of 2007), merged with existing Ulfborg-Vemb and Vinderup municipalities to form the new Holstebro municipality.

Locations

The town of Holstebro

The town of Holstebro, has a population of 34,241 (2011). It is situated on both sides of Storåen ("The Large Creek"). Holstebro is a member of the Douzelage twinning ring of towns.

Politics

Municipal council
Holstebro's municipal council consists of 27 members, elected every four years.

Below are the municipal councils elected since the Municipal Reform of 2007.

Notable people
Helge Nissen (1871–1926), operatic bass-baritone, conductor and film actor
Eugenio Barba (born 1936) founder of the Odin Teatret and International School of Theatre Anthropology

Twin towns – sister cities

Holstebro is a member of the Douzelage, a town twinning association of towns across the European Union.

 Agros, Cyprus
 Altea, Spain
 Asikkala, Finland
 Bad Kötzting, Germany
 Bellagio, Italy
 Bundoran, Ireland
 Chojna, Poland
 Granville, France
 Houffalize, Belgium
 Judenburg, Austria
 Kőszeg, Hungary
 Marsaskala, Malta
 Meerssen, Netherlands
 Niederanven, Luxembourg
 Oxelösund, Sweden
 Preveza, Greece
 Rokiškis, Lithuania
 Rovinj, Croatia
 Sesimbra, Portugal
 Sherborne, England, United Kingdom
 Sigulda, Latvia
 Siret, Romania
 Škofja Loka, Slovenia
 Sušice, Czech Republic
 Tryavna, Bulgaria
 Türi, Estonia
 Zvolen, Slovakia

Holstebro also has one other twin town:
 Brașov, Romania

References

 Municipal statistics: NetBorger Kommunefakta, delivered from KMD aka Kommunedata (Municipal Data)
 Municipal mergers and neighbors: Eniro new municipalities map

External links

 
Holstebro tourist bureau
Peter Schaufuss Ballet (in Danish)
Odin Teatret - performance art theater (limited English language)
Holstebro Art Museum
Holstebro Museum
Holstebro Boldklub (in Danish)

 
Municipalities of the Central Denmark Region
Municipalities of Denmark
Populated places established in 2007